Walter Charles Sidney Levers (9 March 1864 – 10 November 1922) was a New Zealand cricketer who played first-class cricket for Wellington and Hawke's Bay between 1896 and 1909.

Life and career
Charles Levers was born in Bingham, Nottinghamshire. He played cricket for Nottinghamshire Colts before migrating to New Zealand in the 1880s. Standing about six feet six inches tall and weighing about 20 stone in later life, he was a batsman and occasional wicket-keeper. His best first-class match was for Wellington against Hawke's Bay in 1895-96 when he scored 45 and 57 not out, playing a major part in Wellington's avoiding defeat. He served as the honorary secretary of the Wellington Cricket Association for four years till 1901.

Levers was also adept at a wide range of other sports, including football, golf, boxing, athletics, tennis, swimming and billiards. He also sang with a light tenor voice at amateur concerts.

He worked at a number of occupations in New Zealand. He was manager of the town hall at Foxton in the Manawatu district soon after his arrival. In 1896 he was a hotel broker in Wellington. He was then for a time a commercial traveller before moving to Auckland and working in the wine-and-spirit business.
 
He died after contracting pneumonia while recuperating from an operation. He was survived by his wife, Ethel.

References

External links

Charles Levers at CricketArchive

1864 births
1922 deaths
People from Bingham, Nottinghamshire
Cricketers from Nottinghamshire
English emigrants to New Zealand
New Zealand cricketers
New Zealand cricket administrators
Wellington cricketers
Hawke's Bay cricketers